Cornelis "Nelis" van Dijk (8 January 1904 – 31 October 1969) was a Dutch boxer who competed in the 1920 Summer Olympics. He was born in Gouda and died in Rotterdam. In 1920 he eliminated in the first round of the flyweight class after losing his fight to the upcoming silver medalist Anders Pedersen.

References

1904 births
1969 deaths
Flyweight boxers
Olympic boxers of the Netherlands
Boxers at the 1920 Summer Olympics
Sportspeople from Gouda, South Holland
Dutch male boxers